Arthur Lee McCullough (December 3, 1896 – January 6, 1979) was a brigadier general in the United States Air Force.

Biography 
McCullough was born in Milwaukee, Wisconsin, in 1896. He attended Rensselaer Polytechnic Institute.

Career 
McCullough graduated from the United States Military Academy in 1920 and was assigned to the United States Army Corps of Engineers. He transferred to the Air Corps in 1925. During World War II, he took part in the Allied invasion of Sicily. Following the war, he was given command of the 514th Troop Carrier Wing, the 313th Troop Carrier Wing, and was assigned to Continental Air Command.

Awards he received include the Legion of Merit, the Bronze Star Medal, and the Air Medal with oak leaf cluster.

References 

Military personnel from Milwaukee
United States Air Force generals
Recipients of the Legion of Merit
Recipients of the Air Medal
United States Army Air Forces pilots of World War II
United States Military Academy alumni
Rensselaer Polytechnic Institute alumni
1896 births
1979 deaths